The Subliminal Verses World Tour was a worldwide concert tour in 2004 and 2005 headlined by Slipknot in support of their third studio album Vol. 3: (The Subliminal Verses).

Preparation
Before organizing the tour, Slipknot vocalist Corey Taylor commented that he was "probably the most vocal of the guys who really didn’t feel good coming back to Slipknot", and during the tour, he said that he was "basically eating my words, eating a lot of crow this time around. [... But] it's really good. [...] It's good to be humbled and know you’re in a band that's fantastic."

During the tour, the band's third studio album Vol. 3: (The Subliminal Verses) was approaching the platinum mark, and two of its tracks were nominated for the year's Grammy Awards ("Duality" for Best Hard Rock Performance and "Vermilion" for Best Heavy Metal Performance).

Performers
As is typical of the band, Slipknot members are masked and costumed when performing on stage. They received support at various stages of the tour from Fear Factory, Chimaira, Hatebreed and Shadows Fall. Slipknot also played as support to Metallica and Slayer.

The band Lamb of God also performed on the tour. When the tour arrived in Los Angeles on April 9, 2005 to perform at The Forum, Lamb of God was banned from opening for Slipknot because the church that owned the venue did not appreciate the band's old name of Burn the Priest.

Set list

Tour dates

References

External links
 Slipknot

Slipknot (band) concert tours
2004 concert tours
2005 concert tours